The Party for the North (PvhN) is a regional political party in the Netherlands founded in December 2002 representing the interests of the provinces of Groningen, Friesland and Drenthe. The PvhN seeks a separate Parliament for these 3 northern provinces, and for 25% of the country's profits from natural gas to go directly to them.

Elections
Since 11 March 2003 the PvhN has had two seats on the States-Provincial of Groningen, and (since 6 March 2006) one seat on the city council of Delfzijl.  In the States-Provincial elections of 7 March 2007 the Party remained stable, getting 3.6% of the vote and being reduced from 2 to 1 seat in Groningen due to the reduction in the total number of seats in each States-Provincial.  In Friesland and Drenthe, where the party fought for the first time in the 2007 elections, it won no seats that year.

In the Senate the Party for the North has allied with the Independent Senate Group (OSF).  The OSF has won one seat in the Senate, by Henk ten Hoeve at Stiens.

European Parliament
In 2004 the party participated in the elections for the European Parliament.  The party obtained 18,234 votes (0.4% of the vote overall, though this rose to 4-5% of the vote in some northern municipalities), not enough for a seat.

City councils
In the March 2006 city-council (Gemeenteraad) elections, the PvhN for the first time contested in three cities (Groningen, Delfzijl and Emmen). In Delfzijl the party won one seat.

Regionalist parties in the Netherlands
Politics of Drenthe
Politics of Friesland
Politics of Groningen (province)
Political parties established in 2002
2002 establishments in the Netherlands